Streptomyces cinereospinus is a bacterium species from the genus of Streptomyces.

See also 
 List of Streptomyces species

References

Further reading

External links
Type strain of Streptomyces cinereospinus at BacDive -  the Bacterial Diversity Metadatabase

cinereospinus
Bacteria described in 1986